Sir David Robert Foskett (born 19 March 1949), styled The Hon. Mr Justice Foskett, is a judge of the High Court of England and Wales.

Education
He was educated at Warwick School and at King's College London (LLB, 1970) during which time he also served as President of the Students' Union and was awarded the College's Jelf Medal.

Career
He was called to the bar at Gray's Inn in 1972 and became a bencher there in 1999 and Treasurer in 2018 in succession to Baroness Hale. He was made a QC in 1991, recorder from 1995-2007, deputy judge of the High Court from 1998-2007, and judge of the High Court of Justice (Queen's Bench Division) since 2007. 

Foskett is the author of the leading text on the law of compromise in England and Wales. He is a member of the Athenaeum Club.

On 1 June 2019, Sir David took up the role of Chair of the Civil Mediation Council.  The Civil Mediation Council is a Registered Charity and is the professional and regulatory body for civil and workplace mediators in England and Wales.  In taking up his position as the CMC’s fifth Chair, Sir David said “I am delighted to have been invited to take over from Alan Ward as Chair of the Civil Mediation Council. As ever, Alan will be a hard act to follow and the Council is greatly in his debt for the hard work and support he has given it over the last six years. I acted as a mediator before my appointment as a judge and have been an active supporter of the process during my judicial career. I am looking forward to bringing that experience into the mediation process and, more importantly, with the assistance of my colleagues in the Council, to advancing the cause of mediation at a time when the need for the assisted resolution of disputes without recourse to litigation or other proceedings is more pressing than ever.”

References

1949 births
Living people
People educated at Warwick School
Alumni of King's College London
Fellows of King's College London
Members of Gray's Inn
20th-century English judges
Queen's Bench Division judges
Knights Bachelor
21st-century English judges